Cardiff Metropolitan University Rugby Football Club (aka Cardiff Met RFC) is a Welsh rugby union team currently playing in the WRU Championship based at Cardiff Metropolitan University.

Notable former players

Inclusion criteria: Attained international caps
 
 Sam Cross

Club honours
Glamorgan County Silver Ball Trophy 1968-69 - Winners
Glamorgan County Silver Ball Trophy 1969-70 - Winners
WRU Division One East 2009/10 - Champions

References

External links
Official site

Sport in Cardiff
Welsh rugby union teams
University and college rugby union clubs
Rugby club